Adajania is an Indian (Parsi) toponymic surname for Adajan, a suburb of Surat in India. Notable people with the surname include:

 Aspy Adajania (1942–1994), Indian Army officer and sports administrator, father of Homi Adajania
 Homi Adajania (born 1972), Indian film director and writer
 Nancy Adajania (born 1971), Indian cultural theorist and art critic
 Anaita Shroff Adajania (born 1972), Indian fashion designer

Toponymic surnames
Indian surnames
Surnames of Indian origin
Gujarati-language surnames
Parsi people
People from Surat